Mellin is a village and a former municipality in the district Altmarkkreis Salzwedel, in Saxony-Anhalt, Germany.

Mellin can also refer to:

Charles Mellin (1597–1649), French painter
Hjalmar Mellin (1854–1933), Finnish mathematician
Ludwig August Mellin (1754–1835), Baltic German cartographer and politician
Mellin's Food an early infant formula manufacturer